The Federation of Cuban Women (FMC) was established in 1960 under the revolutionary government with Vilma Espín as its president. Espin fought in the Sierra Maestras with Fidel Castro and Raul Castro and married Raul in 1959. She was the president of the FMC until her death in 2007. The FMC was deeply involved in the 1961 Cuban literacy campaign and in supplying workers after the mass exodus of trained labor following the Revolution. A few of the stated goals of the FMC are:

 Bringing women out of the home and into the economy
 Reorganizing peasant households that keep women in subservient positions
 Developing communal services to alleviate domestic work and childcare
 Providing equal opportunities for women
 Mobilizing women into political work and government administration 
 Providing adequate working conditions "to satisfy the particular needs of the female organism and the moral and spiritual needs of women as mothers."

FMC & The Cuban Literacy Campaign
The Cuban Literacy Campaign was a national effort to eradicate illiteracy in Cuba following the 1959 Revolution. Shortly after the Revolution, motivated by patriotism and sustained by political will, Fidel Castro declared that illiteracy would be eradicated within 1 year. Accordingly, during 1959 and 1960 the groundwork was laid for a mass literacy campaign, La Alfabetización. In the year leading up to the campaign, the FMC was charged with identifying illiterate women and convincing them to participate. During the campaign itself "figures indicate that more than 91,000 women participated with the FMC in La Alfabetización. Thousands of women became teachers and other cared for the young boys and girls ages 11-16, who formed the Conrado Benitez Brigade." "On December 22, 1961, when Cuba was declared a "territory Free of Illiteracy" 55% of the 700,000 new literates were women.

FMC & The 1975 Family Code
1966 Fidel Castro made a speech in which he called for the addition of a million women to the labor force. Many women responded to this and entered the work force only to leave again when the burden of family and work proved too difficult.  During the 1970s many improvements were made that allowed women to return to work, daycare centers were opened and other services provided. But still women lagged men in the workforce, making up only 25% of the force. In 1975 the FMC made a nationwide inquiry to investigate the reasons behind this.  The result of this inquiry was the Family Code of 1975. The code gave men and women equal rights and equal responsibilities in the home and increased state social services. Some of the unique outcomes of this code were that working women were to have first rights to buy appliances that saved time, cafeterias were opened in the work place and health clinics were kept open later. Plan Jaba gave working women shopping priority. They could drop off their bags at the store in the morning together with a shopping list and pick them up in the evening on the way home already filled.

Second National Congress of the Federacion de Mujeres Cubanas November 25–29, 1974
The second national congress is an example of the work of the FMC. Its 1,916 delegates were elected in an intense and lengthy process beginning at the grass-roots level. They came from every background and every level of education. The congress' slogan was "To Deepen Women's Revolutionary Action!"  Topics covered by the congress included bringing the Family Code to Vietnam. "Close to sixteen years of revolution has produced a keenly politicized, combative Cuban Woman, capable of deep analysis, concise projection and- most impressive- with the ability to conceive of  herself as a part of an immense group in which all individuals are related in effort and purpose and in which solutions are sought and worked out collectively"  Not only were Cuban women united in solidarity with other Cuban women but with the women of the world. They invited representatives of other countries and allowed them to participate. There were women from Chile, Costa Rica and a Soviet cosmonaut.

References

Bibliography
 Harris, Colette, "Socialist Societies and the Emancipation of Women: The Case of Cuba." Socialism and Democracy 9:1(1995)91-113. Print.
 McCall, Cecelia, "Women and Literacy: The Cuban Experience" Journal of Reading 30:4(Jan.1987)318-324. Print.
 Randall, Margaret, "We Need a Government of Men And Women…!" Latin American Perspectives 2:4(1975)111-117. Print.

Women's rights in Cuba
Women's organizations based in Cuba
Women's wings of communist parties
Communist Party of Cuba
Organizations based in Havana
1960 establishments in Cuba
Organizations established in 1960
1960 in Cuba